National Social Security Fund may refer to:

National Social Security Fund (Kenya)
National Social Security Fund (Tanzania)
National Social Security Fund (Uganda)
The National Social Security Fund that is managed by National Council for Social Security Fund - China